Gulf Shore is a community in Cumberland County, Nova Scotia, Canada.

The Gulf Shore is home to many cottages due to its warm water beaches and lovely view of  Prince Edward Island .

Due to the large number of cottages, the population fluctuates dramatically winter to summer, with only a few year-round residents. The main employment is in agriculture and tourism. The Gulf Shore is the location for the Northumberland Links Golf Course.

The Gulf Shore was once home to a one-room school house (demolished in the 1980s), and Melville United Church (demolished in the late 1990s).

References

Communities in Cumberland County, Nova Scotia